Entrance generally refers to the place of entering like a gate, door, or road or the permission to do so.

Entrance may also refer to:
 Entrance (album), a 1970 album by Edgar Winter
 Entrance (display manager), a login manager for the X window manager
 Entrance (liturgical), a kind of liturgical procession in the Eastern Orthodox tradition
 Entrance (musician), born Guy Blakeslee
 Entrance (film), a 2011 film
 The Entrance, New South Wales, a suburb in Central Coast, New South Wales, Australia
 "Entrance" (Dimmu Borgir song), from the 1997 album Enthrone Darkness Triumphant
 Entry (cards), a card that wins a trick to which another player made the lead, as in the card game contract bridge
 N-Trance, a British electronic music group formed in 1990
 University and college admissions
 Entrance Hall
 Entryway

See also
Enter (disambiguation)
Entry (disambiguation)